Naval Assault: The Killing Tide is a 2010 Xbox 360 game developed by Artech Studios and published by 505 Games.

Plot 
Set in an alternate history where the Soviet Union has surrendered to Nazi Germany, the missions follow a US Naval Special Ops team operating a submarine during World War II as they battle the Axis powers.

Gameplay 
The player controls a submarine in third-person and has the ability to sink deep into the water, just under the water, and rise above the water. The submarine is equipped with long range torpedoes and gun turrets.
The player will come across enemy depth charges, aircraft, and submarines.

Reception 

Naval Assault: The Killing Tide received generally mixed to negative reviews. IGN's Anthony Gallegos called it 'simple' and 'boring' and criticized the presentation, graphics, and lasting appeal of the game saying 'You'll play this for a few moments, realize it isn't as fun as you hoped, and likely never play it again.' He gave it a 4.5/10 which IGN rates as 'bad'.
Metacritic gave it an overall score of 40/100.

References

2010 video games
Submarine simulation video games
Action video games
Xbox 360 games
505 Games games
Multiplayer and single-player video games
Video games developed in Canada
World War II video games
Xbox 360-only games
Alternate history video games
Artech Studios games